Javier Cabot Durán (born 27 September 1953) is a former field hockey player from Spain, who won the silver medal with the Men's National Team at the 1980 Summer Olympics in Moscow.

References
Spanish Olympic Committee

External links
 

1953 births
Living people
Spanish male field hockey players
Field hockey players from Barcelona
Olympic field hockey players of Spain
Olympic silver medalists for Spain
Field hockey players at the 1980 Summer Olympics
Field hockey players at the 1984 Summer Olympics
Olympic medalists in field hockey
Medalists at the 1980 Summer Olympics
20th-century Spanish people